Nicotine blue oxidoreductase (nboR (gene)) is an enzyme with systematic name 3,3'-bipyridine-2,2',5,5',6,6'-hexol:NADP+ 11-oxidoreductase. This enzyme catalyses the following chemical reaction

 3,3'-bipyridine-2,2',5,5',6,6'-hexol + NAD(P)+  (E)-2,2',5,5'-tetrahydroxy-6H,6'H-[3,3'-bipyridinylidene]-6,6'-dione + NAD(P)H + H+

This enzyme is extracted from bacterium Arthrobacter nicotinovorans.

References

External links 
 

EC 1.1.1